Baker County High School may refer to:

 Baker County High School (Newton, Georgia), US
 Baker County High School (Glen St. Mary, Florida), US

See also
 Baker High School (disambiguation)